The thick-billed euphonia (Euphonia laniirostris) is a species of bird in the family Fringillidae, formerly placed in the Thraupidae.

This euphonia measures . The male has entirely yellow underparts from throat to vent save for a small terminal patch of white on the undertail. Upperparts are a dark blue-black except for the yellow crown patch which extends from the bill over the head to just past the eye. The female, like many euphonias, is dull olive above and yellow below.

It is found in Bolivia, Brazil, Colombia, Costa Rica, Ecuador, Panama, Peru, and Venezuela. Its natural habitats are subtropical or tropical dry forests, subtropical or tropical moist lowland forests, and heavily degraded former forest.

References

External links

 Thick-billed euphonia Images at Animal Diversity Web (University of Michigan)
 
 
 
 
 
 

thick-billed euphonia
Birds of Costa Rica
Birds of Panama
Birds of Colombia
Birds of Venezuela
Birds of Ecuador
Birds of the Amazon Basin
Birds of the Peruvian Amazon
Birds of the Bolivian Amazon
thick-billed euphonia
Taxonomy articles created by Polbot
Taxa named by Frédéric de Lafresnaye
Taxa named by Alcide d'Orbigny